Li Yitong may refer to:

 Li Yitong (singer) (born 1995), Chinese idol singer
 Li Yitong (actress) (born 1990), Chinese actress